The Karen, also known as the Kayin, Kariang or Kawthoolese, are an ethnolinguistic group of Sino-Tibetan language–speaking peoples. The group as a whole is heterogeneous and disparate as many Karen ethnic groups do not associate or identify with each other culturally or linguistically. These Karen groups reside primarily in Kayin State, southern and southeastern Myanmar. The Karen, approximately five million people, account for approximately seven percent of the Burmese population. Many Karen have migrated to Thailand, having settled mostly on the Myanmar–Thailand border. A few Karen have settled in the Andaman and Nicobar Islands, India, and other Southeast Asian and East Asian countries.

The Karen groups as a whole are often confused with the Padaung tribe, best known for the neck rings worn by their women, but they are just one sub-group of Red Karens (Karenni), one of the tribes of Kayah in Kayah State, Myanmar.

Karen insurgent groups, led primarily by the Karen National Union (KNU), have waged war against the Burmese government since early 1949. The original aim of the KNU was to create an independent Karen homeland called Kawthoolei, but since 1976 they have shifted towards calling for a federal system in Myanmar instead. Even so, the KNU has declined invitations to speak with the Burmese government.

Origins 

Karen legends refer to a "river of running sand" which ancestors reputedly crossed. Many Karen believe this refers to the Gobi Desert, although they have lived in Myanmar for centuries. Most scholars dismiss the notion of a Gobi desert crossing, but rather translate the legend as describing "rivers of water flowing with sand". This could refer to the sediment-laden Yellow River of China, the upper reaches of which is considered to be the Urheimat of Sino-Tibetan languages. According to the legends, the Karen took a long time to cook shellfish at the river of flowing sand, until the Chinese taught the Karens to open the shells so as to acquire the meat. It is estimated by linguists Luce and Lehman that the Tibeto-Burman peoples such as the Karen migrated into present-day Myanmar between 300 and 800 CE.

Karen refers to a heterogeneous lot of ethnic groups that do not share a common language, culture, religion, or material characteristics. A pan-Karen ethnic identity is a relatively modern creation, established in the 19th century with the conversion of some Karen to Christianity and shaped by various British colonial policies and practices.

"Karen" is an Anglicisation of the Burmese word Kayin, whose etymology is unclear. The word may have originally been a derogatory term referring to non-Buddhist ethnic groups, or it may derive from Kanyan, a possibly Mon name of a vanished civilisation.

In pre-colonial times, the low-lying Burmese and Mon-speaking kingdoms recognised two general categories of Karen, the Talaing Kayin, generally lowlanders who were recognised as the "original settlers" and essential to Mon court life, and the Karen, highlanders who were subordinated or assimilated by the Bamar.

Distribution 

The Karen constitute the third largest ethnic population in Myanmar, after the Bamars and Shans.
The Karen people live mostly in the hills bordering the eastern mountainous region and Irrawaddy delta of Myanmar, primarily in Kayin State (formerly Karen State), with some in Kayah State, southern Shan State, Ayeyarwady Region, Tanintharyi Region, Bago Division and in northern and western Thailand.

The total number of Karen is difficult to estimate. The last reliable census of Myanmar was conducted in 1931. A 2006 Voice of America article cites an estimate of seven million Karen in Myanmar. There are another 400,000 Karen in Thailand, where they are by far the largest of the hill tribes. Others live in refugee camps in Thailand.

Some Karen have left the refugee camps in Thailand to resettle elsewhere, including in North America, Australia, New Zealand, and Scandinavia. In 2011, the Karen diaspora population was estimated to be approximately 67,000.

Political history

British period 
Following British victories in the three Anglo-Burmese wars, Myanmar was annexed as a province of British India in 1886. Baptist missionaries introduced Christianity to Myanmar beginning in 1830, and they were successful in converting many Karen. Christian Karens were favoured by the British colonial authorities and were given opportunities not available to the Burmese ethnic majority, including military recruitment and seats in the legislature. Some Christian Karens began asserting an identity apart from their non-Christian counterparts, and many became leaders of Karen ethno-nationalist organisations, including the Karen National Union.

In 1881 the Karen National Associations (KNA) was founded by western-educated Christian Karens to represent Karen interests with the British. Despite its Christian leadership, the KNA sought to unite all Karens of different regional and religious backgrounds into one organisation. They argued at the 1917 Montagu–Chelmsford hearings in India that Myanmar was not "yet in a fit state for self-government". Three years later, after submitting a criticism of the 1920 Craddock Reforms, they won 5 (and later 12) seats in the Legislative Council of 130 (expanded to 132) members. The majority Buddhist Karens were not organised until 1939 with the formation of a Buddhist KNA.
In 1938 the British colonial administration recognised Karen New Year as a public holiday.

World War II 
During World War II, when the Japanese occupied the region, long-term tensions between the Karen and Burma turned into open fighting. As a consequence, many villages were destroyed and massacres committed by both the Japanese and the Burma Independence Army (BIA) troops who helped the Japanese invade the country. Among the victims were a pre-war Cabinet minister, Saw Pe Tha, and his family. A government report later claimed the "excesses of the BIA" and "the loyalty of the Karens towards the British" as the reasons for these attacks. The intervention by Colonel Suzuki Keiji, the Japanese commander of the BIA, after meeting a Karen delegation led by Saw Tha Din, appears to have prevented further atrocities.

Post-war 
The Karen people aspired to have the regions where they formed the majority turned into a subdivision or "state" within Myanmar similar to what the Shan, Kachin and Chin peoples had been given. A goodwill mission led by Saw Tha Din and Saw Ba U Gyi to London in August 1946 failed to receive any encouragement from the British government for any separatist demands.

In January 1947 a delegation of representatives of the Governor's Executive Council headed by Aung San was invited to London to negotiate for the Aung San–Attlee Treaty, but none of the ethnic minority groups was included by the British government. The following month at the Panglong Conference, when an agreement was signed between Aung San as head of the interim Burmese government and the Shan, Kachin and Chin leaders, the Karen were present only as observers; the Mon and Arakanese were also absent.

The British promised to consider the case of the Karen after the war. While the situation of the Karen was discussed, nothing practical was done before the British left Myanmar. The 1947 Constitution, drawn without Karen participation due to their boycott of the elections to the Constituent Assembly, also failed to address the Karen question specifically and clearly, leaving it to be discussed only after independence. The Shan and Karenni states were given the right to secession after 10 years, the Kachin their own state, and the Chin a special division. The Mon and Arakanese of Ministerial Myanmar were not given any consideration.

Karen National Union 

In early February 1947, the Karen National Union (KNU) was formed at a Karen Congress attended by 700 delegates from the Karen National Associations, both Baptist and Buddhist (KNA, founded 1881), the Karen Central Organisation (KCO) and its youth wing, the Karen Youth Organisation (KYO), at Vinton Memorial Hall in Yangon. The meeting called for a Karen state with a seaboard, an increased number of seats (25%) in the Constituent Assembly, a new ethnic census, and a continuance of Karen units in the armed forces. The deadline of 3 March passed without a reply from the British government, and Saw Ba U Gyi, the first president of the KNU, resigned from the Governor's Executive Council the next day.

After the war ended, Myanmar was granted independence in January 1948, and the Karen, led by the KNU, attempted to co-exist peacefully with the Burman ethnic majority. Karen people held leading positions in both the government and the army. In the fall of 1948, the Burmese government, led by U Nu, began raising and arming irregular political militias known as Sitwundan. These militias were under the command of Major Gen. Ne Win and outside the control of the regular army. In January 1949, some of these militias went on a rampage through Karen communities.

The Karen National Union has maintained its structure and purpose from the 1950s onward. The KNU acts as a governmental presence for the Karen people, offering basic social services for those affected by the insurgency, such as Karen refugees or internally displaced Karen. These services include building school systems in Thailand and inside Burma, providing medical services, regulating trade and commerce, and providing security through the Karen National Liberation Army (KNLA), the KNU's army.

Insurgency 
In late January 1949, the Army Chief of Staff, Gen. Smith Dun, a Karen, was removed from office and imprisoned. He was replaced by the Burmese nationalist Ne Win. Simultaneously a commission was looking into the Karen problem and this commission was about to report their findings to the Burmese government. The findings of the report were overshadowed by this political shift at the top of the Burmese government. The Karen National Defence Organisation (KNDO), formed in July 1947, then rose up in an insurgency against the government. They were helped by the defections of the Karen Rifles and the Union Military Police (UMP) units which had been successfully deployed in suppressing the earlier Burmese Communist rebellions, and came close to capturing Yangon itself. The most notable was the Battle of Insein, nine miles from Yangon, where they held out in a 112-day siege till late May 1949.

Years later, the Karen had become the largest of 20 minority groups participating in an insurgency against the military dictatorship in Yangon. During the 1980s, the Karen National Liberation Army (KNLA) fighting force numbered approximately 20,000. After an uprising of the people of Myanmar in 1988, known as the 8888 Uprising, the KNLA had accepted those demonstrators in their bases along the border. The dictatorship expanded the army and launched a series of major offensives against the KNLA. By 2006, the KNLA's strength had shrunk to less than 4,000, opposing what is now a 400,000-man Burmese army. However, the political arm of the KNLA - the KNU - continued efforts to resolve the conflict through political means.

The conflict continues , with a new KNU headquarters in Mu Aye Pu, on the Burmese–Thai border. In 2004, the BBC, citing aid agencies, estimates that up to 200,000 Karen have been driven from their homes during decades of war, with 160,000 more refugees from Myanmar, mostly Karen, living in refugee camps on the Thai side of the border. The largest camp is the one in Mae La, Tak province, Thailand, where about 50,000 Karen refugees are hosted.

Reports as recently as February 2010, state that the Burmese army continues to burn Karen villages, displacing thousands of people.
Many Karen, including people such as former KNU secretary Padoh Mahn Sha Lah Phan and his daughter, Zoya Phan, have accused the military government of Myanmar of ethnic cleansing. The U.S. State Department has also cited the Burmese government for suppression of religious freedom.

A 2005 New York Times article on a report by Guy Horton into depredations by the Myanmar Army against the Karen and other groups in eastern Myanmar stated:

Using victims' statements, photographs, maps and film, and advised by legal counsel to the UN tribunal on the former Yugoslavia, he purports to have documented slave labour, systematic rape, the conscription of child soldiers, massacres and the deliberate destruction of villages, food sources and medical services.

Refugee crisis 
Throughout the insurgency, hundreds of thousands of Karen fled to refugee camps while many others (numbers unknown) were internally displaced persons within the Karen state. The refugees were concentrated in camps along the Myanmar–Thailand border. According to refugee accounts, the camps suffered from overcrowding, disease, and periodic attacks by the Myanmar Army.

Life in refugee camps 
Around 400,000 Karen people are without housing, and 128,000 are living in camps on the Thailand-Burma border. According to BMC, "79% of refugees living in these camps are Karen ethnicity." Their lives are restricted in the camps because they usually cannot go out, and the Thai police might arrest them if they do. Employment for the Karen refugees is scarce and risky. Former refugee Hla Wah said, "No jobs [...] So if adults wanted to work, they had to leave quietly without getting caught by Thai police." Wah is a Karen refugee who lived in a camp where she went to school and helped her family because her parents sought to go out to work, but they earned little money. Wah suffered from malnutrition because her parents did not have money to buy food for her nine siblings.

There is an established governance system in the camps, which are funded by the United Nations, and other donors. The Karen Refugee Committee governs the day-to-day administration of the camp under the authority of the Thai government which guards entrances and exits to the camp. Within the camp there is a robust school system for children up to high school. In some camps there are college courses organized by the Karen Refugee Committee – Education Entity.

Karen diaspora 
Beginning in 2000, the Karen started resettling in the United States and Canada. Many Karen have problems fitting in and adjusting to the new country. "90% of the Karen refugees reported no knowledge of English or French on arrival." An estimated 8,500 Karen live in Minnesota, primarily Saint Paul. In 2014, Ler Htoo was sworn in after graduating from the St. Paul Police Academy in Minnesota as the first Karen police officer in the United States. More than 5,000 Karen live in Nebraska, and the Karen have also resettled in Southern California and central New York. Mu Aye is a young Karen woman who has resettled in San Diego, CA. Aye said, "After growing up in a place like I did, I wanted to become a nurse. I wanted to help sick people [...] travel to refugee camps in Thailand and care for people who cannot afford medication." Additionally, Eh De Gray, who graduated from San Diego's Crawford High School, wants to go back to the camps and share his knowledge with the school children. Gray said, "I want to share my knowledge and experiences with them."

Andaman Karen population 

There is a population of 2,500 Karen in India, mostly restricted to Mayabunder Tehsil of the Northern Andaman Islands within the union territory of the Andaman and Nicobar Islands. Nearly all of them are Baptist Protestant Christians. They retain their language to intercommunicate within community, but use Hindi as a second language to communicate with non-Karen neighbours.

Language 

The Karen languages, members of the Tibeto-Burman group of the Sino-Tibetan language family, consist of three mutually unintelligible branches: Sgaw, Eastern Pwo, and Western Pwo.
The Karen languages are almost unique among the Tibeto-Burman languages in having a subject–verb–object word order; other than Karen and Bai, Tibeto-Burman languages typically feature a subject–object–verb order. This anomaly is likely due to the influence of neighbouring Mon and Tai languages.

Religion 

The majority of Karens are Theravada Buddhists who also practice animism, while approximately 15 percent are Christian. Lowland Pwo-speaking Karens tend to be more orthodox Buddhists, whereas highland Sgaw-speaking Karens tend to be heterodox Buddhists who profess strong animist beliefs.

Like many of the Chinese Indonesians, many of the Karen in Myanmar who identify themselves as Buddhists are actually not Buddhists, but they have their own ethnic religion.

Animism 
Karen animism is defined by a belief in ကလၤ k’lar (soul), thirty-seven spirits that embody every individual. Misfortune and sickness are believed to be caused by k’lar that wander away, and death occurs when all thirty-seven klar leave the body.

Buddhism 
Karen Buddhists are the most numerous of the Karens and account for around 65 percent of the total Karen population. The Buddhist influence came from the Mon who were dominant in Lower Burma until the middle of the 18th century. Buddhist Karen are found mainly in Kayin State, Mon State, Yangon, Bago and Tanintharyi Region. There are Buddhist monasteries in most Karen villages, and the monastery is the centre of community life. Merit-making activities, such as alms giving, are central to Karen Buddhist life.

Buddhism was brought to Pwo-speaking Karens in the late-1700s, and the Yedagon Monastery atop Mount Zwegabin became the leading center of Karen language Buddhist literature. Many millennial sects were founded throughout the 1800s, led by Karen Buddhist minlaung rebels. Two sects, Telakhon (or Telaku) and Leke, were founded in the 1860s. The Tekalu sect, founded in Kyaing and considered a Buddhist sect, is a mixture of spirit worship, Karen customs and worship of the future Buddha Metteyya. The Leke sect was founded on the western banks of the Thanlwin River, and is no longer associated with Buddhism (as followers do not venerate Buddhist monks). Followers believe that the future Buddha will return to Earth if they maintain their moral practices (following the Dhamma and precepts), and they practice vegetarianism, hold Saturday services and construct distinct pagodas. Several Buddhist socioreligious movements, both orthodox and heterodox, have arisen in the past century. Duwae, a type of pagoda worship, with animistic origins, is also practised.

There are several prominent Karen Buddhist monks, including Thuzana (S'gaw) and Zagara, who was conferred the Agga Maha Saddammajotika title by the Burmese government in 2004. The Karen of Thailand have their own religion.

Christianity 

Tha Byu, the first convert to Christianity in 1828, was baptised by Rev. George Boardman, an associate of Adoniram Judson, founder of the American Baptist Foreign Mission Society. Today there are Christians belonging to the Catholic Church and various Protestant denominations. Some of the largest Protestant denominations are Baptists and Seventh-day Adventists.

Alongside orthodox Christianity, some of those who identify themselves as Christian also have syncretised elements of animism with Christianity. The Karen of the Irrawaddy delta are mostly Christians, whereas Buddhists tend to be found mainly in Kayin state and surrounding regions. An estimated 15 to 20 percent of Karen identify themselves as Christian today and about 90 percent of Karen people in the US are Christians.

The Karen Baptist Convention (KBC) was established in 1913. Its headquarters is in Yangon with 20 member associations throughout Myanmar. The KBC operates the KBC Charity Hospital in Insein, Yangon. The KBC also operates the Karen Baptist Theological Seminary in Insein. The seminary runs a theology program as well as a secular degree program (Liberal Arts Programme) to fulfill young Karens' intellectual and vocational needs. The Pwo Karen Baptist Convention is in Ahlone, Yangon and also operates the Pwo Karen Theological Seminary. There are other schools for Karen people in Myanmar, such as Paku Divinity School in Taungoo, Kothabyu Bible School in Pathein, and Yangon Home Mission School. The Thailand Karen Baptist Convention is in Chiang Mai, Thailand.

The Seventh-day Adventists have built several schools in the Karen refugee camps in Thailand to convert the Karen people. Eden Valley Academy in Tak and Karen Adventist Academy in Mae Hong Son are the two largest Seventh-day Adventist Karen schools.

Culture 

Crop rotation agriculture has been a part of Karen culture for at least several hundred years.

The don dance is a traditional Karen performance. "Don" roughly translates to "in agreement". The dance is a series of uniform movements accompanied by music played from traditional Karen instruments. During the performance, a "Don Koh" leads the troupe of dancers. The don dance originated from the Pwo Karen, who developed it as a way to reinforce community values.

The sae klee dance or bamboo dance is a traditional Karen performance held during celebrations such as Christmas and New Year's. Performers are typically divided into two groups. One group creates a platform by holding bamboo sticks in a checkered pattern, while the other group dances on top of the platform. Dancers must be careful to avoid stepping into one of the platform's many holes.

Cuisine 
Talabaw or bamboo soup is a traditional Karen dish typically prepared with bamboo shoots, snakehead fish and basil leaves. A small amount of rice and some shreds of meat or seafood may also be added. The soup was traditionally used as a supplement to rice, which was not readily or cheaply available to them. Talabaw is one of the most well known soups in Myanmar, and widely considered to be the essential dish of Karen cuisine.

Holidays 
The Karen New Year (ကညီနံၣ်ထီၣ်သီ) is one of the major holidays that the Karen people celebrate. The date of the Karen New Year on the Gregorian calendar varies as the Karen people use the lunar calendar. The Karen New Year usually falls on a date in December or January on the Gregorian calendar.

Karen Wrist Tying (ကညီလါခူးကံၢ်စု) is an important Karen holiday. This holiday is observed annually in August.

Karen Martyrs' Day (Ma Tu Ra) commemorates the Karen soldiers who have died fighting for Karen self-determination. It is observed annually on 12 August, the anniversary of the death of Saw Ba U Gyi, the first President of the Karen National Union.

Eponyms 
A species of gecko, Hemidactylus karenorum, is named in honour of the Karen people.

See also 
 U Thuzana
 Taung Galay Sayadaw
 Karenni
 Karen Baptist Convention
 Karen Baptist Theological Seminary
 Karen of the Andamans
 Karen Teacher Working Group
 Paku Divinity School
 Rambo, 2008 film

Notes

References

Further reading

 
 
 
 
 Forbes, Andrew, and Henley, David, 'Chiang Mai's Hill Peoples' in: Ancient Chiang Mai Volume 3. Chiang Mai, Cognoscenti Books, 2012. ASIN: B006IN1RNW

External links 

 the Karen people of Burma by David Tharckabaw, Roland Watson (2003)
 San C. Po, Burma and the Karens (London 1928)
 Karenvoice.net, shares the information of Karen interacting in the world from the past, struggling in Burma in the present and transiting in the world again in the future
 Karens Around the World Unite.
 Karen Human Rights Group, a new website documenting the human rights situation of Karen villagers in rural Burma
 Kawthoolei meaning "a land without evil", is the Karen name of the land of Karen people. An independent and impartial media outlet aimed to provide contemporary information of all kinds — social, cultural, educational and political
 Adventist World Radio Karen
 Kwekalu literally "Karen Traditional Horn", the only online Karen language news outlet based in Mergui/Tavoy District of Kawthoolei
 Karen Women's Organization
 Karen Don Dance (YouTube)

 
Ethnic groups in Myanmar
Ethnic groups in Thailand